Casis or Casís is a surname. Notable people with this name include:

 Ana Casís, Panamanian sociologist, statistician, and demographer
 Jazminne Casis, Australian gymnast in 2012 Pacific Rim Gymnastics Championships – Women's Artistic Gymnastics
 Julio Súmar Casis (born 1931), Peruvian chess player
 Luis Casis, Panamanian politician, vice-presidential candidate in 2019 Panamanian general election
 Tomasa Ester Casís (1878–1962), Panamanian teacher and women's rights activist

See also
 Center for the Advancement of Science in Space (CASIS), managing organization for the International Space Station